Tomas Angel Gonzalez Trigo (born June 8, 1989), also known as Tommy Trigo, is a Spanish-born Filipino former footballer who played as a goalkeeper. He has been a member of the Philippines national team.

Club career

Loyola
Trigo made his debut with the club in a 4-0 win against Laos FC. Towards the end of July 2016, Trigo left Loyola Meralco Sparks and subsequently quit the sport to move back to Spain and pursue a career in teaching.

International career
Trigo has a Filipino maternal grandfather making him eligible to play for the Philippines at the international level. Trigo made his first international debut on November 14, 2014 when he entered as a substitute in a friendly against Cambodia three minutes before second-half injury time, replacing Patrick Deyto.  It was his only appearance for the Philippines national team.

Coaching career

Mulier FCN
A year after retiring as a professional footballer, Trigo was appointed as goalkeeper coach of Mulier FCN's senior team.

Peña Sport
In 2019, Trigo was appointed as goalkeeper coach of Tercera División club Peña Sport.

Osasuna Feminino
A year later, Trigo was appointed as goalkeeper coach of CA Osasuna Femenino.

Honours

Club
Loyola
PFF National Men's Club Championship: 2014–15

Individual awards
2014–15 PFF National Men's Club Championship Golden Glove

References

1989 births
Living people
Footballers from Pamplona
Citizens of the Philippines through descent
Spanish people of Filipino descent
Spanish sportspeople of Asian descent
Filipino footballers
Filipino expatriate footballers
Spanish footballers
Association football goalkeepers
Philippines international footballers
F.C. Meralco Manila players
Team Socceroo F.C. players